The Hunter 290 is an American sailboat that was designed by the Hunter Design Team as a cruising boat and first built in 1999.

Production
The design was built by Hunter Marine in the United States between 1999 and 2002, but it is now out of production.

Design
The Hunter 290 is a recreational keelboat, built predominantly of fiberglass. It has a fractional sloop B&R rig, a raked stem, a walk-through reverse transom, an internally-mounted spade-type rudder controlled by a wheel and a fixed fin keel with a weighted bulb or optional wing keel. It displaces  and carries  of lead ballast.

Factory supplied standard equipment included a 110% roller furling jib, two self-tailing jib winches, arch-mounted mainsheet, rack and pinion steering, private forward cabin, aft stateroom, convertible dinette table,  or stand-up cabin headroom, stainless steel sink, two burner stove, top-loading ice box, four plates, bowls and mugs, with built-in storage, Danforth anchor, fog horn, four life jackets. Optional equipment included a hot and cold transom shower, two-burner gimbaled LPG stove, spinnaker and associated rigging and winches, in-mast mainsail furling system, GPS and a bimini top.

The design has a PHRF racing average handicap of 186 with a high of 190 and low of 186.

See also
List of sailing boat types

Similar sailboats
Alberg 29
Bayfield 29 
C&C 29
Cal 29
Island Packet 29
Mirage 29
Prospect 900
Tanzer 29
Thames Marine Mirage 29
Watkins 29

References

External links
Official brochure

Keelboats
1990s sailboat type designs
Sailing yachts
Sailboat type designs by Hunter Design Team
Sailboat types built by Hunter Marine